Darcy Hordichuk (born August 10, 1980) is a Canadian former professional ice hockey winger. He has previously played for the Vancouver Canucks, Nashville Predators, Atlanta Thrashers, Phoenix Coyotes,  Florida Panthers and Edmonton Oilers.

Playing career
After playing midget hockey with the Yorkton Mallers of the SMHL, Hordichuk joined the Calgary Hitmen of the Western Hockey League (WHL) for 3 games in the 1996–97 season. The next year would see Hordichuk playing with the Dauphin Kings of the Manitoba Junior Hockey League (MJHL), a Junior 'A' league. In 58 games with the Kings, Hordichuk had 12 goals and 33 points, as well as 279 penalty minutes. He would spend the next two seasons in the WHL, playing with the Saskatoon Blades, where he had 515 penalty minutes in 129 games, including 73 fights.

At twenty-years-old, he was drafted in 2000 by the Atlanta Thrashers as the 180th overall pick in the sixth round. Hordichuk became well known in the NHL for his physical play and fighting. Upon being drafted, he was assigned to the Thrashers' minor league affiliate, the Orlando Solar Bears of the International Hockey League (IHL).  He completed his first professional season also appearing in 11 games for the Thrashers as a call-up.  He secured a roster spot with the club in his second year, but was dealt at the trade deadline to the Phoenix Coyotes along with a fifth-round draft pick in 2002 in exchange for prospects Kirill Safronov and Ruslan Zainullin.  The following season, he was dealt to the Florida Panthers along with a second-round draft pick in exchange for defenceman Brad Ference.  As he was swapped between teams in his first three seasons, Hordichuk played mostly in the minor leagues.

After the 2004–05 NHL lockout, Hordichuk joined the Nashville Predators and recorded career-highs with 7 goals, 6 assists and 13 points in his first season with the team.  He re-signed with the club to a one-year contract on July 16, 2007.  After his third season in Nashville, his rights were traded to the Carolina Hurricanes in exchange for a 2008 fifth-round draft pick on June 19, 2008, as he was set to become a free agent.  He did not, however, come to terms with the Hurricanes and instead signed with the Vancouver Canucks on July 1.  With Vancouver, Hordichuk scored his first NHL playoff goal in 2009, beating Nikolai Khabibulin in game four of the second round against the Chicago Blackhawks, a 2–1 loss for the Canucks.

Hordichuk was fined $2,500 by the NHL early in the 2009–10 season after checking Columbus Blue Jackets winger Jared Boll's head into the boards during a game on October 5, 2009. The following month, Hordichuk received an automatic one-game suspension for instigating a fight with St. Louis Blues forward Cam Janssen in the final five minutes of a game on November 10. Incidentally, he forfeited $4,015.54 in salary. On October 2, 2010, the Vancouver Canucks placed Hordichuk on waivers. Instead of sending him down to the minors, Vancouver traded him to the Florida Panthers for Andrew Peters. Canucks' GM Mike Gillis had previously pledged to try to find Hordichuk another NHL job.

He signed a one-year contract worth $825,000 with the Edmonton Oilers on July 1, 2011. During the 2011 off-season, Hordichuk vowed to abuse the Sedin twins the next time he played against the Canucks.  When the Oilers and Canucks met on October 15, 2011, Hordichuk injured his knee taking a run at Canuck defenseman Keith Ballard, who threw a last-minute hip check at the charging Hordichuk after releasing an outlet pass.

As a free agent, Hordichuk was re-signed by the Edmonton Oilers to a one-year contract worth $850,000. During the lockout, Hordichuk did not sign with a different team, instead focusing his attention on training and improving his game.

On February 11, 2013, Hordichuk was placed on waivers by the Edmonton Oilers. The next day he cleared and was sent to the Oilers' AHL affiliate, the Oklahoma City Barons.

On August 19, 2013, it was reported by Finnish media outlet Ilta-Sanomat, that Hordichuk was offered a one-year deal worth approximately $270,000 (200,000 Euro) by Helsinki IFK of the Finnish Elite League (SM-Liiga), but the 12-year NHL veteran turned the deal down.

Personal
Hordichuk spent summer 2008 training with Chuck Liddell, a mixed martial artist and former Ultimate Fighting Championship light heavyweight champion. Hordichuk used the training to improve on his skills in on-ice fighting.

Hordichuk and his wife Lisa are the parents of Braden Walker Hordichuk, born February 22, 2009, and Declan Chase Hordichuk, born March 16, 2012.

Career statistics

References

External links
 
 

1980 births
Atlanta Thrashers draft picks
Atlanta Thrashers players
Calgary Hitmen players
Canadian ice hockey left wingers
Canadian people of Ukrainian descent
Dauphin Kings players
Edmonton Oilers players
Florida Panthers players
Ice hockey people from Saskatchewan
Living people
Nashville Predators players
Oklahoma City Barons players
People from Kamsack, Saskatchewan
Phoenix Coyotes players
Saskatoon Blades players
Vancouver Canucks players